Leccinum aurantiacum is a species of fungus in the genus Leccinum found in forests of Eurasia and North America. It has a large, characteristically red-capped fruiting body. In North America, it is sometimes referred to by the common name red-capped scaber stalk. Some uncertainties exist regarding the taxonomic classification of this species in Europe and North America. It is considered edible.

Description
Its flesh is white, bruising at first burgundy, then grayish or purple-black. The underside of the cap has very small, whitish pores that bruise olive-brown. It is whitish, with short, rigid projections or scabers that turn to brown to black with age.

Distribution and habitat
L. aurantiacum can be found fruiting during summer and autumn in forests throughout Europe and North America. The association between fungus and host tree is mycorrhizal. In Europe, it has traditionally been associated with poplar trees. Some debate exists about the classification of L. aurantiacum and L. quercinum as separate species. According to authors who do not recognise the distinction, L. aurantiacum is also found among oak trees. Additionally, L. aurantiacum has been recorded with various other deciduous trees, including beech, birch, chestnut, willow, and trees of the genus Tilia. L. aurantiacum is not known to associate with conifers in Europe.

North American populations have been recorded in coniferous and deciduous forests, though whether collections from coniferous forests are not L. vulpinum, instead, remains uncertain. In addition, L. aurantiacum may be absent altogether from North America, with collections from deciduous forests being attributed to other North American species L. insigne, and L. brunneum.

Edibility
This is a favorite species for eating and can be prepared as other edible boletes. Its flesh turns very dark on cooking. Like most members of the Boletaceae, these mushrooms are targeted by maggots. Due to a number of poisonings and the difficulty identifying species, Leccinum species are considered by some as possibly not safe to eat. This species also needs to be cooked well (not parboiled) or else it may cause vomiting or other negative effects. Some report gastrointestinal upset after eating this species.

Similar species

In Europe, several orange-red capped species exist, which differ mainly in habitat. L. albostipitatum grows with aspen and has white scales on the stipe. In coniferous forests, L. vulpinum occurs around pine and spruce trees. Not all authors recognise these as distinct species.

In North America, L. insigne grows in aspen or birch stands, while L. atrostipitatum grows in birch stands. Both are edible. Another similar species is L. versipelle.

See also
List of Leccinum species
List of North American boletes

References

 National Audubon Society Field Guide to North American Mushrooms, Knopf, 1981.

External links

Leccinum aurantiacum at MushroomExpert.com
Leccinum aurantiacum at MykoWeb
Leccinum aurantiacum Leccinum Species May No Longer Be Considered Safe

aurantiacum
Edible fungi
Fungi of Europe
Fungi of Asia
Fungi of North America